Combs Moss is a plateau-topped hill between Chapel-en-le-Frith and Buxton in Derbyshire, in the Peak District.

The moorland plateau is flanked by Combs Edge and the Goyt Valley to the west, the village of Combs to the north, Black Edge and Dove Holes to the east and Buxton to the south. The Midshires Way long-distance footpath follows a Roman Road across the southwestern end of Combs Moss. 

Much of Combs Moss is a privately owned grouse moor, with a shooting hut and grouse butts. Following the Countryside and Rights of Way Act 2000, this area became "Open Access" land for the public.

Castle Naze is the site of a prehistoric hillfort at the northwest edge of Combs Moss, overlooking Combs Reservoir (a designated  Site of Special Scientific Interest). There is a substantial defensive double rampant on the southeast side and protective rock edges on the other sides. The is a clear causeway up the hillside to the former entrance to the fort. In 1873 a Roman coin of Emperor Constantine the Great and Romano-British pottery were found. Nottingham University students conducted a survey of the site in 1957 and concluded that the fort had been built during the Iron Age period and was reconstructed in Medieval times. Buried remains were uncovered of pits, hearths, workshops and the postholes and foundations of buildings. Castle Naze hillfort is a protected Scheduled Monument. The place-name "Naze" derives from Old English næss "ness, promontory, headland". 

The gritstone escarpment at Castle Naze is a popular location for crag climbers.

References 

Mountains and hills of the Peak District
Mountains and hills of Derbyshire
Peak District

Moorlands of England